The 2010 Nielsen Pro Tennis Championship was a professional tennis tournament played on outdoor hard courts. It was the 19th edition of the tournament which was part of the 2010 ATP Challenger Tour. It took place in Winnetka, Illinois, between 28 June and 4 July 2010.

ATP entrants

Seeds

 Rankings are as of June 21, 2010.

Other entrants
The following players received wildcards into the singles main draw:
  John Paul Fruttero
  Ryan Harrison
  Austin Krajicek
  Simon Stadler

The following players received entry as alternative:
  Noam Okun
  Donald Young

The following players received entry from the qualifying draw:
  Pierre-Ludovic Duclos
  Milos Raonic
  Artem Sitak
  Fritz Wolmarans

Champions

Singles

 Brian Dabul def.  Tim Smyczek, 6–1, 1–6, 6–1

Doubles

 Ryler DeHeart /  Pierre-Ludovic Duclos def.  Rik de Voest /  Somdev Devvarman, 7–6(4), 4–6, [10–8]

References

Nielsen Pro Tennis Championship
Nielsen Pro Tennis Championship
Niel
Nielsen Pro Tennis Championship
Nielsen Pro Tennis Championship
Nielsen Pro Tennis Championship